Kuzva is a rural locality (a village) in Beloyevskoye Rural Settlement, Kudymkarsky District, Perm Krai, Russia. The population was 268 as of 2010. There are 10 streets.

Geography 
Kuzva is located 29 km northwest of Kudymkar (the district's administrative centre) by road. Silina is the nearest rural locality.

References 

Rural localities in Kudymkarsky District